Florence Public Library, also known as the Florence County Public Library, is a historic library building located at Florence, Florence County, South Carolina.  It was built in 1925, and is a two-story-over-raised-basement, T-shaped brick veneered building with Neo-Classical Revival architecture and Beaux Arts design influences.  It has a concrete foundation, reinforced concrete walls, limestone decorative elements, and a standing seam metal roof. It was the first public library in Florence. In 1977-1978 the library built a large one-story expansion and made extensive renovations to the original 1925 building.

It was listed on the National Register of Historic Places in 2006.

References

Libraries on the National Register of Historic Places in South Carolina
Neoclassical architecture in South Carolina
Library buildings completed in 1925
National Register of Historic Places in Florence County, South Carolina
Buildings and structures in Florence, South Carolina
1925 establishments in South Carolina